Minnette is an Anglo Norman given name and surname, and it's a variant of the Norman French surname Minnett. Notable persons with the name include:

People with the given name
Minnette Barrett (1880–1964), American actress
Minnette Gersh Lenier (1945–2011), American magician and teacher
Minnette de Silva (1918–1998), Sri Lankan architect
Minnette Vári (born 1968), South African artist

People with the surname
Dylan Minnette (born 1996), American actor, singer, and musician